Alison Bruce (born 23 September 1987) is an Australian field hockey player.

References

1987 births
Living people
Australian female field hockey players
Commonwealth Games medallists in field hockey
Commonwealth Games gold medallists for Australia
Field hockey players at the 2010 Commonwealth Games
21st-century Australian women
Medallists at the 2010 Commonwealth Games